The Armida Quartet, named after the eponymous opera by Joseph Haydn, is a German string quartet. The ensemble includes Martin Funda (violin), Johanna Staemmler (violin), Teresa Schwamm (viola) and Peter-Philipp Staemmler (violoncello).

History 
The quartet was founded in Berlin in 2006 and studied with members of the Artemis Quartet. Master classes with the Alban Berg Quartet, the Guarneri Quartet and Arditti Quartet rounded off their training.

The four musicians became known through their success at the ARD International Music Competition in 2012, where the Armida Quartet was awarded 1st prize, the audience prize and six other special prizes. In September 2014, the quartet was included in the BBC series "New Generation Artists." In the 2016/2017 season, the quartet will be featured across Europe as part of the European Concert Halls (ECHO) "Rising Stars" series.

The Armida Quartet has also performed at the Schleswig-Holstein Music Festival, the Rheingau Musik Festival, the Festspiele Mecklenburg-Vorpommern, the Davos Festival and the Heidelberger Frühling. In 2014, the quartet also made its first concert tour to China, Taiwan and Singapore.

Since October 2012, the four musicians of the Armida Quartet have been teaching chamber music at the Berlin University of the Arts. The musicians of the Armida Quartet are also in demand internationally as guest lecturers; they have already given master classes among others in Singapore and at the Mozart Festival Augsburg.

Awards 
In 2011, the Armida Quartet won the first prize and the audience prize at the Geneva International Music Competition. Before that, the ensemble received various scholarships, including from the Irene Steels-Wilsing Foundation and the Schierse Foundation Berlin. In 2013, the quartet's debut CD with works by Béla Bartók, György Ligeti and György Kurtág was released and shortly afterwards was included in the best list of the Preis der deutschen Schallplattenkritik.

Recording 
 2013: Ursula Mamlok: Streichquartett Nr. 1 (1962) (Naxos)
 2013: Bartók – Kurtág – Ligeti (CAvi)
 2015: Dvorak – Scharwenka (with Ewa Kupiec, Randall Meyers)
 2015: Wolfgang Amadeus Mozart (CAvi Music)
 2016: Beethoven – Dmitri Shostakovich (CAvi Music)

References

External links 
 
 

German string quartets
Musical groups from Berlin
Musical groups established in 2006
2006 establishments in Germany